Buy-Back Program can refer to:

 Land Buy-Back Program for Tribal Nations
 Gun buyback program